Max Deubel (born 5 February 1935 in Wiehl, Germany) is a German former professional sidecar racer. He was four time FIM Sidecar World Champion and a three-time Isle of Man Sidecar TT winner.

Deubel and Hörner were awarded the 1966 Sidecar World Championship after Fritz Scheidegger and John Robinson were excluded for a fuel irregularity at the Isle of Man TT, but on appeal Scheidegger and Robinson were reinstated three months later. Deubel retired after the 1966 season and has remained involved in motorsport as an FIM official. In 2015, Deubel was named an FIM Legend for his motorcycle racing achievements.

References

External links
Max Deubel profile at www.iomtt.com

Isle of Man TT riders
German motorcycle racers
Living people
1935 births
Sidecar racers